Mexican culture is primarily influenced by its Indigenous inhabitants and the culture of Spain. Mexican culture is described as the 'child' of both western and native American civilizations. Other minor influences include those from other regions of Europe, as well as Asia and Africa.

First inhabited more than 10,000 years ago, the cultures that developed in Mexico became one of the cradles of civilization. During the 300-year rule by the Spanish, Mexico was a crossroads for the people and cultures of Europe and Latin America. The government of independent Mexico actively promoted shared cultural traits in order to create a national identity. The culture that is known is Mexico today, from Mariachis to Cowboys, were created by Mestizo people.

The culture of an individual Mexican is influenced by familial ties, gender, religion, location, and social class, among other factors. Contemporary life in the cities of Mexico has become similar to that in the neighboring United States and in Europe, with provincial people conserving traditions more than city dwellers.

Religion

The Spanish arrival and colonization brought Roman Catholicism to the country, which became the main religion of Mexico. Mexico is a secular state, and the Constitution of 1917 and anti-clerical law imposed limitations on the church and sometimes codified state intrusion into church matters. The government does not provide any financial contributions to the church, and the church does not participate in public education.

In 2010, 95.6% of the population were Christian. Roman Catholics are 89% of the total, 47% percent of whom attend church services weekly. In absolute terms, Mexico has the world's second largest number of Catholics after Brazil.  
According to the Government's 2000 census, approximately 87 percent of respondents identified themselves as at least nominally Roman Catholic. Christmas is a national holiday and every year during Easter and Christmas all schools in Mexico, public and private, send their students on vacation.

Other religious groups for which the 2000 census provided estimates included evangelicals, with 1.71 percent of the population; other Protestant evangelical groups, 2.79 percent; members of Jehovah's Witnesses, 1.25 percent; "Historical" Protestants, 0.71 percent; Seventh-day Adventists, 0.58 percent; The Church of Jesus Christ of Latter-day Saints, 0.25 percent; Jews, 0.05 percent; and other religions, 0.31 percent. Approximately 3.52 percent of respondents indicated no religion, and 0.86 percent did not specify a religion.

Arts

Mexico is known for its folk art traditions, mostly derived from the indigenous and Spanish crafts. Pre-Columbian art thrived over a wide timescale, from 1800 BC to AD 1500. Certain artistic characteristics were repeated throughout the region, namely a preference for angular, linear patterns, and three-dimensional ceramics.

Notable handicrafts include clay pottery from the valley of Oaxaca and the village of Tonala. Colorfully embroidered cotton garments, cotton or wool shawls and outer garments, and colorful baskets and rugs are seen everywhere. Mexico is also known for its pre-Columbian architecture, especially for public, ceremonial and urban monumental buildings and structures.

Following the conquest, the first artistic efforts were directed at evangelization and the related task of building churches. The Spanish initially co-opted many indigenous stonemasons and sculptors to build churches, monuments and other religious art, such as altars. The prevailing style during this era was Baroque.
In the period from independence to the early 20th century, Mexican fine arts continued to be largely influenced by European traditions.

After the Mexican Revolution, a new generation of Mexican artists led a vibrant national movement that incorporated political, historic and folk themes in their work. The painters Diego Rivera, José Clemente Orozco, and David Siqueiros were the main propagators of Mexican muralism. Their grand murals often displayed on public buildings, promoted social ideals. Rufino Tamayo and Frida Kahlo produced more personal works with abstract elements. Mexican art photography was largely fostered by the work of Manuel Álvarez Bravo.

Literature

Mexican literature has its antecedents in the literature of the indigenous settlements of Mesoamerica and European literature. The most well known prehispanic poet is Netzahualcoyotl. Modern Mexican literature is influenced by the concepts of the Spanish colonialization of Mesoamerica. Outstanding colonial writers and poets include Juan Ruiz de Alarcón and Sor Juana Inés de la Cruz.

Other notable writers include Alfonso Reyes, José Joaquín Fernández de Lizardi, Ignacio Manuel Altamirano, Maruxa Vilalta, Carlos Fuentes, Octavio Paz (Nobel Laureate), Renato Leduc, Mariano Azuela ("Los de abajo"), Juan Rulfo ("Pedro Páramo") and Bruno Traven.

Language

Mexico is the most populous Spanish-speaking country in the world. Although the overwhelming majority of Mexicans today speak Spanish, there is no de jure official language at the federal level. The government recognizes 62 indigenous Amerindian languages as national languages.

Some Spanish vocabulary in Mexico has roots in the country's indigenous languages, which are spoken by approximately 6% of the population. Some indigenous Mexican words have become common in other languages, such as the English language. For instance, the words tomato, chocolate, coyote, and avocado are Nahuatl in origin.

Architecture

With thirty-four sites, Mexico has more sites on the UNESCO World Heritage list than any other country in the Americas; most of the sites pertain to Mexico's architectural history. Mesoamerican architecture in Mexico is best known for its public, ceremonial, and urban monumental buildings and structures, several of which are the largest monuments in the world. Mesoamerican architecture is divided into three eras, Pre-Classic, Classic, and Post-Classic. Architect Frank Lloyd Wright is reputed to have declared the Puuc-style architecture of the Maya as the best in the Western Hemisphere.

The New Spanish Baroque dominated in early colonial Mexico. During the late 17th century to 1750, one of Mexico's most popular architectural styles was Mexican Churrigueresque, which combined Amerindian and Moorish decorative influences.

The Academy of San Carlos, founded in 1788, was the first major art academy in the Americas. The academy promoted Neoclassicism, focusing on Greek and Roman art and architecture. Notable Neoclassical works include the Hospicio Cabañas, a world heritage site, and the Palacio de Minería, both by Spanish Mexican architect Manuel Tolsá.

From 1864 to 1867, during the Second Mexican Empire, Maximilian I was installed as emperor of Mexico. His architectural legacy lies in the redesigning of the Castillo de Chapultepec and creating the Paseo de la Reforma. This intervention, financed largely by France, was brief, but it began a period of French influence in architecture and culture. The style was emphasized during the presidency of Porfirio Diaz, who was a pronounced francophile. Notable works from the Porfiriato include the Palacio de Correos and a large network of railways.

After the Mexican Revolution in 1917, idealization of the indigenous and the traditional symbolized attempts to reach into the past and retrieve what had been lost in the race toward modernization.

Functionalism, expressionism, and other schools left their imprint on a large number of works in which Mexican stylistic elements have been combined with European and American techniques, most notably the work of Pritzker Prize winner Luis Barragán. His personal home, the Luis Barragán House and Studio, is a World Heritage Site.

Enrique Norten, the founder of TEN Arquitectos, has been awarded several honors for his work in modern architecture. His work expresses a modernity that reinforces the government's desire to present a new image of Mexico as an industrialized country with a global presence.

Other notable and emerging contemporary architects include Mario Schjetnan, Michel Rojkind, Isaac Broid Zajman,  Bernardo Gómez-Pimienta, and Alberto Kalach.

Cinema

The history of Mexican cinema dates to the beginning of the 20th century when several enthusiasts of the new medium documented historical events – most particularly the Mexican Revolution. The Golden Age of Mexican cinema is the name given to the period between 1935 and 1959, where the quality and economic success of the cinema of Mexico reached its peak. An era when renowned actors such as Cantinflas and Dolores del Río appeared on the silver screen.

Present-day film makers include Alejandro González Iñárritu (Amores perros, Babel), Alfonso Cuarón (Children of Men, Harry Potter and the Prisoner of Azkaban), Guillermo del Toro (Pan's Labyrinth), Carlos Reygadas (Stellet Licht), screenwriter Guillermo Arriaga and directors of photography such as Guillermo Navarro and Emmanuel Lubezki.

National holidays

Mexicans celebrate their Independence from Spain on September 16, and other holidays are celebrated with festivals known as "Fiestas". Many Mexican cities, towns, and villages hold a yearly festival to commemorate their local patron saints. During these festivities, the people pray and burn candles to honor their saints in churches decorated with flowers and colorful utensils. They also hold large parades, fireworks, dance competitions, and beauty pageant contests, all the while partying and buying refreshments in the marketplaces and public squares. In the smaller towns and villages, soccer, and boxing are also celebrated during the festivities.

Other festivities include Día de Nuestra Señora de Guadalupe ("Our Lady of Guadalupe Day"), Las Posadas ("The Shelters", celebrated on December 16 to December 24), Noche Buena ("Holy Night", celebrated on December 24), Navidad ("Christmas", celebrated on December 25) and Año Nuevo ("New Year's Day", celebrated on December 31 to January 1).

"Guadalupe Day" is regarded by many Mexicans as the most important religious holiday of their country. It honors the Virgin of Guadalupe, the patron saint of Mexico, and it is celebrated on December 12. In the last decade, all the celebrations happening from mid-December to the beginning of January have been linked together in what has been called the Guadalupe-Reyes Marathon.

Epiphany on the evening of January 5 marks the Twelfth Night of Christmas and is when the figurines of the three wise men are added to the nativity scene. Traditionally in Mexico, as with many other Latin American countries, Santa Claus does not hold the significance that he does in the United States. Rather, it is the three wise men who are the bearers of gifts, who leave presents in or near the shoes of small children. Mexican families also commemorate the date by eating Rosca de reyes.

The Day of the Dead incorporates pre-Columbian beliefs with Christian elements. The holiday focuses on gatherings of family and friends to pray for and remember friends and family members who have died. An idea behind this day suggests the living must attend to the dead so that the dead will protect the living. The celebration occurs on November 2 in connection with the Catholic holidays of All Saints' Day (November 1) and All Souls' Day (November 2). Traditions connected with the holiday include building private altars honoring the deceased, using sugar skulls, marigolds, and the favorite foods and beverages of the departed, and visiting graves with these as gifts. The gifts presented turn the graveyard from a dull and sorrowful place to an intimate and hospitable environment to celebrate the dead.

In modern Mexico, particularly in the larger cities and in the North, local traditions are now being observed and intertwined with the greater North American Santa Claus tradition, as well as with other holidays such as Halloween, due to Americanization via film and television, creating an economy of gifting tradition that spans from Christmas Day until January 6.

A piñata is made from papier-mache. It is created to look like popular people, animals, or fictional characters. Once made it is painted with bright colors and filled with candy or small toys. It is then hung from the ceiling. The children are blindfolded and take turns hitting the piñata until it breaks open and the candy and small toys fall out. The children then gather the candy and small toys.

Cuisine

Mexican cuisine is known for its blending of Indigenous and European cultures. The cuisine was inscribed in 2010 on the Representative List of the Intangible Cultural Heritage of Humanity by UNESCO. Traditionally, the main Mexican ingredients consisted of maize, beans, both red and white meats, potatoes, tomatoes, seafood, chili peppers, squash, nuts, avocados and various herbs native to Mexico.

Popular dishes include tacos, enchiladas, mole sauce, atole, tamales, and pozole. Popular beverages include water flavored with a variety of fruit juices, and cinnamon-flavored hot chocolate prepared with milk or water and blended until it becomes frothed using a traditional wooden tool called a molinillo. Alcoholic beverages native to Mexico include mescal, pulque, and tequila. Mexican beer is also popular in Mexico and are exported. There are international award-winning Mexican wineries that produce and export wine.

The most important and frequently used spices in Mexican cuisine are chili powder, cumin, oregano, cilantro, epazote, cinnamon, and cocoa. Chipotle, a smoked-dried jalapeño pepper, is also common in Mexican cuisine. Many Mexican dishes also contain onions and garlic, which are also some of Mexico's staple foods.

Next to corn, rice is the most common grain in Mexican cuisine. According to food writer Karen Hursh Graber, the initial introduction of rice to Spain from North Africa in the 14th century led to the Spanish introduction of rice to Mexico at the port of Veracruz in the 1520s. This, Graber says, created one of the earliest instances of the world's greatest Fusion cuisines.

In southeastern Mexico, especially in the Yucatán Peninsula, spicy vegetable and meat dishes are common. The cuisine of Southeastern Mexico has quite a bit of Caribbean influence, given its geographical location. Seafood is commonly prepared in the states that border the Pacific Ocean or the Gulf of Mexico, the latter having a famous reputation for its fish dishes, à la veracruzana.

Chocolate originated in Mexico and was prized by the Aztecs. It remains an important ingredient in Mexican cookery.

Vanilla originated in Mexico. It was first cultivated by the Totonacs of Mexico’s east coast. Vanilla is used in Mexico to flavor horchata and Mexican desserts such as churros.

Mexican tea culture is known for its traditional herbal teas such as chamomile, linden, orange blossom, spearmint and lemongrass.

Music and dance

The foundation of Mexican music comes from its indigenous sounds and heritage. The original inhabitants of the land used drums (such as the teponaztli), flutes, rattles, conches as trumpets and their voices to make music and dances. This ancient music is still played in some parts of Mexico. However, much of the traditional contemporary music of Mexico was written during and after the Spanish colonial period, using many old world influenced instruments. Many traditional instruments, such as the Mexican vihuela used in Mariachi music, were adapted from their old world predecessors and are now considered very Mexican.

Mexican society enjoys a vast array of music genres, showing the diversity of Mexican culture. Traditional music includes Mariachi, Banda, Norteño, Ranchera and Corridos. Traditional Mexican music enjoys some popularity outside Mexico, and is particularly popular in Chile.

Mexicans also listen to contemporary music such as pop and Mexican rock. Mexico has the largest media industry in Latin America, producing Mexican artists who are famous in the Americas and parts of Europe.

Folk songs called corridos have been popular in Mexico since the early nineteen hundreds. It may tell the story of the Mexican Revolution, pride, Mestizaje, romance, poverty, politics, or crime. Notable Afro-Mexican contributions to the country's music are the Son Jarocho and the marimba.

Mariachis perform along streets, festivals and restaurants. A common Mariachi group can include singers, violins, a guitarrón, a guitarra de golpe, vihuela, guitars, and trumpets. The most prominent Mariachi group is Vargas de Tecalitlán, which was originally formed in 1897.

Other styles of traditional regional music in México: Huapango or Son Huasteco (Huasteca, northeastern regions, violin and two guitars known as quinta huapanguera and jarana), Tambora (Sinaloa, mainly brass instruments) Duranguense, Jarana (most of the Yucatán peninsula) and Norteña (North style, redoba and accordion).

Folk dances are a feature of Mexican culture. Significant in dance tradition is the "Jarabe Tapatío", known as "Mexican hat dance". Traditional dancers perform a sequence of hopping steps, heel, and toe-tapping movements.

Among the most known "classical" composers: Manuel M. Ponce ("Estrellita"), Revueltas, Jordá (Elodia), Ricardo Castro, Juventino Rosas ("Sobre las olas"), Carrillo (Sonido 13), Ibarra, Pablo Moncayo (Huapango) and Carlos Chávez.

Popular composers includes: Agustín Lara, Consuelo Velázquez ("Bésame mucho"), José Alfredo Jiménez, Armando Manzanero, Álvaro Carrillo, Joaquín Pardavé and Alfonso Ortiz Tirado.

Traditional Mexican music has influenced the evolution of the Mexican pop and Mexican rock genre. Some well-known Mexican pop singers are Luis Miguel and Alejandro Fernández. Latin rock musicians such as Carlos Santana, Café Tacuba, and Caifanes have incorporated Mexican folk tunes into their music. Traditional Mexican music is still alive in the voices of artists such as Lila Downs.

Sport

The traditional national sport of Mexico is Charreria, which consists of a series of equestrian events. The national horse of Mexico, used in Charreria, is the Azteca. Bullfighting, a tradition brought from Spain, is also popular. Mexico has the largest venue for bullfighting in the world - the Plaza México in Mexico City which seats 48,000 people.

Football is the most popular team sport in Mexico. Most states have their own representative football teams. Among the country's significant teams include Chivas de Guadalajara, Club América, Cruz Azul, and Pumas de la UNAM. Notable players include Hugo Sánchez, Claudio Suárez, Luis Hernández, Francisco Palencia, Cuauhtémoc Blanco, Memo Ochoa, Jared Borgetti, Rafael Márquez, Pável Pardo, and Javier Hernández.

The country hosted the Summer Olympic Games in 1968 and the FIFA World Cup in 1970, 1986, and the upcoming 2026 and will be first country to host the FIFA World Cup three times.

See also

 National symbols of Mexico
 List of museums in Mexico 
 Folktales of Mexico
 Ghosts in Mexican culture
 Festivals in Mexico
 Mexican handcrafts and folk art
 Textiles of Mexico
 Mexican ceramics
 Traditional Mexican handcrafted toys
 China Poblana
 Papel picado
 Vaquero
 Quinceañera, celebration of a girl's fifteenth birthday
 Lotería, game
 Serape, shawl
 Rebozo
 Conquian, card game
 Alebrije, folk art sculptures
 El Chavo del Ocho, sitcom
 Rodeo
 Narcoculture in Mexico
 Flag of Mexico
 Mexican tea culture

References

External links
 Mexico: History and Culture
 Mexican culture: Customs and traditions
 Core Concepts - Mexican Culture — Cultural Atlas